Pope, California may refer to:
Pope, San Joaquin County, California

See also
Pope Valley, California